Korean Agency for Technology and Standards (KATS) is the government standards organization for South Korea. It is part of the Ministry of Knowledge Economy.

It is authorized to regulate and manage the legal measures of South Korea by the current Measures Act.

KATS is a member of the International Organization for Standardization (ISO), as well as the International Electrotechnical Commission (IEC).

See also
 Korea Association of Standards & Testing Organizations

References

External links 

ISO member bodies